Ricky Collard is a former British racing driver. He is the son of BTCC racer Rob Collard and the grandson of Hot Rod racer Mick Collard.

Career

He started his racing career in karts in 2006, finishing fourth in the British Cadet Championship in 2009, sixth in the Kartmasters British Grand Prix KF3 category in 2011, and eighth in the U18 Karting World Championship in 2012. That season he also made his car racing debut in the Ginetta Junior Championship. He competed in the 2015 MSA Formula Championship (British Formula 4), having finished seventh in the 2014 British Formula Ford Championship the previous year. He took six wins and finished 2015 as runner up in the MSA Formula Championship to Lando Norris, graduating to the BRDC British F3 Championship in 2016 with Carlin Motorsport alongside Norris.

Ricky made his British Touring Car Championship debut at Rockingham 2018, substituting his father Rob Collard who was ruled out on medical advice following concussion suffered at the previous round at Snetterton, also bringing about concerns he had not fully recovered a heavy impact at Silverstone 2017.  Ricky drove the West Surrey Racing BMW 1 series and finished his first race in 17th position.

Following the 2022 season, where he drove for Toyota Gazoo Racing UK in the BTCC, Collard announced that he would be retiring from racing.

Racing record

Career summary

† As Collard had not competed in the required number of rounds, he was ineligible for a championship position.

Complete British GT Championship results
(key) (Races in bold indicate pole position) (Races in italics indicate fastest lap)

Complete British Touring Car Championship results
(key) (Races in bold indicate pole position – 1 point awarded in first race; races in italics indicate fastest lap – 1 point awarded all races; * signifies that driver lead race for at least one lap – 1 point awarded all races)

Complete Blancpain GT World Challenge Europe results

References

1996 births
Living people
English racing drivers
British Touring Car Championship drivers
British F4 Championship drivers
BRDC British Formula 3 Championship drivers
24H Series drivers
Ginetta Junior Championship drivers
Arden International drivers
Karting World Championship drivers
ADAC GT Masters drivers
Blancpain Endurance Series drivers
Carlin racing drivers
Schnitzer Motorsport drivers
Rowe Racing drivers
R-Motorsport drivers
BMW M drivers
Toyota Gazoo Racing drivers
Lamborghini Squadra Corse drivers